Ivan Franatica Sorkočević (1706 – 1771) was a writer from Dubrovnik, at the time the Republic of Ragusa.

Sources 
 
 
 
 

Franatica
1706 births
1771 deaths
People from the Republic of Ragusa
Ragusan writers